Anantrao Vitthalrao Deshmukh hailing from Risod is an Indian politician from Maharashtra, former Minister Of State as Finance, Planning, Employment guarantee scheme, Information and Public relations, Government Of Maharashtra and former member of the Indian National Congress. He is also President of The Arya Shikshan Sanstha which has school namely Bharat Madhyamik School Risod, Bharat Prathamik School Risod, Bharat Kanya School Risod, Sunrise English School Risod, Bharat Junior and Senior College Risod, Bharat Madhyamik School Chinchamba Pen, Bharat Madhyamik School Chinchamba Bhar. He is one of the leading politician from Akola and Washim districts. Before formation of Washim district. In 1974 he was elected as member of gram panchayat. In 1979 he was elected as Akola Jilha Parishad member with highest votes in Vidarbha. In 1981 he was elected as President of Akola Youth Congress. In 1982 he was elected as Akola Khadi Board President. For the first time in 1985 he was elected as a member of the Legislative Assembly of Maharashtra from Karanja then he was Minister of State for Finance, Employment guarantee scheme, Information and Public relations. Anantrao Vithhalrao Deshmukh in 1989 and 1991 was Member of Parliament from Washim Lok Sabha Constituency. Having hold on Hindi, English, Marathi was given Best Parliamentry Member Award. He has been on positions like Maharashtra Pradesh Congress Committee Vice President, Indian National Congress Member. He lost in 1999 Lok Sabha election from and Washim Yawatmal Lok Sabha Constituency. In 2009 and 2019 he contested election independently from Risod Vidhansabha Constituency and lost with margin of  around 2000 and 1900 respectively. After formation of Washim District he has hold on Washim Jilha Parishad, Risod Municipal Council, Malegaon Nagar Panchayat. He when in Congress was known as Washim District Congress Godfather. He has connection in all villeges, cities of Washim District. He entered BJP with his son Nakul Anantrao Deshmukh and Chaitanya Anantrao Deshmukh on 14 March 2023 due to negligence of Congress on him though he had lot of power in district and good connections in all over India. He was classmate of Rajesh Pilot and Madhavrao Sindia. He has good connections with late Rajiv Gandhi, Sushilkumar Shinde, Pruthviraj Chavhan, late Vilasrao Deshmukh, Devendra Fadnavis, Chandrashekhar Bavankule, Rajendra Patni etc.

References

Living people
Indian National Congress politicians from Maharashtra
Year of birth missing (living people)